Fan Wei (born 2 September 1962) is a Chinese skit, sitcom and film actor best known for his performances with Zhao Benshan and Gao Xiumin in CCTV New Year's Galas since 1995. In recent years, he has been featured in such films as Cell Phone, A World Without Thieves, If You Are the One and City of Life and Death. He has also acted in several television series produced in mainland China and is a member of the Fàn family.

Early life 
Fan was born in Dadong District of Shenyang, Liaoning, on 2 September 1962. His father was a publicity officer in a factory and his mother was a salesperson. He has an elder sister and a younger brother. In 1978, by age 16, Fan studied acting from Chen Lianzhong, an actor of Shenyang Ballad Singers Troupe in which Fan officially joined five years later. In 1986, he took part in the National Xiangsheng Competition, leading him became widely known to audiences in northeast China.

Acting career 
In 1999, Fan made his film debut with a small role in Male Sorority Director. His first main role in a movie came with the Spring Subway, alongside Xu Jinglei, Geng Le, Zhang Yang and Wang Ning.

In 2003, Fan's performance in the comedy film The Parking Attendant in July which earned him Best Actor at the 28th Montreal World Film Festival and 11th Beijing College Student Film Festival and was nominated for Best Actor at the  Golden Rooster Awards. That same year, he got a small role in Feng Xiaogang's comedy-drama film Cell Phone.

Fan had key supporting role in the 2004 A World Without Thieves, an action drama film starring Andy Lau, Rene Liu, Ge You, Li Bingbing, and Wang Baoqiang.

In 2007, he appeared in the comedy film Lucky Dog, which earned hi a Best Actor at the 9th Chinese Film Media Awards and received nomination at the 23rd Golden Rooster Awards. That same year, he co-starred with Liu Ye, Gao Yuanyuan, and Qin Lan in Lu Chuan's drama film City of Life and Death.

In 2008, Fan was cast in romantic comedy film If You Are the One, opposite Ge You, Shu Qi, Alex Fong Chung-Sun, Feng Yuanzheng and Vivian Hsu. He won the Students' Choice Award for Favorite Actor at the 16th Beijing College Student Film Festival for his performance in Set Off.

Fan had a small role in the 2009 historical drama The Founding of a Republic.

In 2010, for his role in Brothers' Happiness, Fan won the Audience Favorite TV Actor at the 25th Golden Eagle Awards and Most Charismatic Actor at the 16th Magnolia Awards.

In 2011, Fan portrayed politician Li Yuanhong in the propaganda film The Founding of a Party. He played the title role in the comedy film Crazy Dinner Party, co-starring Huang Bo, Monica Mok, and Liu Hua. He played a lead role as Priest in the comedy film Guns and Roses, alongside Lei Jiayin, Guo Tao and Tao Hong. He played the role of Kong Lingxue in Tracks Kong Lingxue, for which he earned Most Brilliant Actor at the 3rd China Image Film Festival in London.

In 2012, he played Lao Ma, the lead role in Feng Xiaogang's Back to 1942, costarring Zhang Guoli, Chen Daoming, Li Xuejian, Zhang Hanyu, Feng Yuanzheng and Xu Fan.

In 2013, Fan was cast as a lead role in the Huayi Brothers's production Personal Tailor, costarring Ge You, Bai Baihe, Li Xiaolu and Zheng Kai.

Fan was cast in the fantasy-adventure-comedy film Monk Comes Down the Mountain (2014), playing the teacher of Wang Baoqiang's character.

In 2016, he landed a guest starring role in the comedy film I Am Not Madame Bovary, a film adaptation based on the novel I Did Not Kill My Husband by novelist Liu Zhenyun. He took the lead role in the drama film Someone to Talk To, which also adapted from Liu Zhenyun's novel.

In 2017, Fan earned critical acclaim for his performance in the black-and-white film Mr. No Problem, for which he earned Best Leading Actor at the 53rd Golden Horse Awards, Best Actor at the 7th Beijing International Film Festival, and received Best Actor nominations at the 11th Asian Film Awards, 25th Beijing College Student Film Festival, and 9th China Film Director's Guild Awards.

In 2019, he was cast in the crime film Hunt Down, playing the father of Jiao Junyan's and husband of Chen Shu's characters. He was nominated for Best Supporting Actor at the 12th Macau International Movie Festival.

Fan starred opposite Liu Haocun and Zhang Yi in Zhang Yimou's drama film One Second. He also appeared in Love You Forever, opposite Li Yitong and Lee Hong-chi.

In 2021, he starred in the war film Railway Heroes with Zhang Hanyu, Vision Wei, Zhou Ye and Yu Haoming.

Personal life 
In 1988, Fan was introduced by a friend to Yang Baoling, a nurse of Shenyang Children's Hospital. They got married on 10 April 1990. Their son Fan Xiwen was born at the end of 1992.

Filmography

Film

Television

CCTV New Year's Gala

Awards and nominations

Film awards

Television series awards

References

External links

Male actors from Liaoning
1962 births
Male actors from Shenyang
Living people
Chinese male stage actors
Chinese xiangsheng performers
Chinese male film actors
Chinese male television actors
Chinese male voice actors